Back Street is a 1941 American drama film directed by Robert Stevenson and starring Charles Boyer and Margaret Sullavan. It is a remake of the 1932 film of the same name, also from Universal. The film is adapted from the 1931 Fannie Hurst novel and the 1932 film version which it follows very closely, in some cases    recalling the earlier film scene-for-scene. It is a sympathetic tale of an adulterous couple.

The 1941 version was nominated for an Academy Award for Best Music (Score of a Dramatic Picture) (Frank Skinner).

Margaret Sullavan so much wanted Charles Boyer to play her leading man, that she relinquished top billing in order to persuade him to appear in this unsympathetic role.

Plot summary 
The film is set in the early 1900s. It tells the story of a pretty and independent young woman, Ray Smith, who lives in Cincinnati. She has many suitors, none of whom she takes seriously. One day she meets an extremely charming and handsome banker named Walter Louis Saxel, and they fall immediately into a strong attraction, which for her is real love. After a few days of closeness she is shocked when he tells her he is already engaged to someone else. Nonetheless, the two of them very nearly marry one another on an impulse, but they are prevented from doing so by arbitrary external forces.

After five years, they meet once again, by chance, in New York City. The banker is now married with two children (Richard and Elizabeth) and is extremely successful in his career, but Ray and he still share the same strong attraction. Ray loves him so much that she gives up her career in dress design and becomes his kept mistress, seeing him only when it is convenient for him. Walter keeps up the appearance of a "happy marriage" and never considers divorcing his wife, whose father is his boss at the banking company.

Ray's loyalty to Walter collapses only once, when he fails to contact her after he has been on an extended trip to Europe with his wife. Ray goes back to Ohio and agrees to marry Curt, an attractive and good-hearted man who proposed to her many times in their youth. However, Walter travels to Ohio to find her, and is able to persuade her to return with him.

Once Walter's children reach adulthood they understand who Ray is, and they despise her. People in Walter's social circle also point condemning fingers at Ray, who suffers all this with patience and fortitude.

In old age, dying of a stroke in his grand home, Walter's last faltering word is to Ray, on the phone. She dies not long afterwards in her apartment.

Cast

References

External links 
 
 
 

1941 films
1941 drama films
American drama films
Remakes of American films
American black-and-white films
Films based on American novels
Films set in Cincinnati
Films set in New York City
Films set in the 1900s
Films set in the 1910s
Films set in the 1920s
Films set in the 1930s
Universal Pictures films
Adultery in films
Films directed by Robert Stevenson
Films scored by Frank Skinner
Films based on works by Fannie Hurst
1940s American films
1940s English-language films